Remodelista is an interior design and lifestyle website operated by Remodelista LLC. It was founded in 2007 by the current editor-in-chief Julie Carlson along with Francesca Connolly, Janet Hall, and Sarah Lonsdale. The company is based in New York City.

History 
Remodelista was founded as an independent website in 2007 by Carlson, Connolly, Hall, and Lonsdale to provide an online sourcebook for users planning a home renovation or remodel with the goal of furnishing rooms with a mix of classics, vintage finds and modernist pieces.

In 2008, Josh Groves joined as publisher and later becomes CEO. Following its redesign in 2009 and continuous growth, Remodelista was acquired by San Francisco company SAY Media in August 2011.

In 2012, Remodelista spins off its garden section to an independent sister website under SAY Media ownership, Gardenista, with former New York Times columnist Michelle Slatalla as editor-in-chief.

In 2014, Times Internet partnered with SAY Media to launch an Indian version of Remodelista.

In 2015, Julie Carlson and Josh Groves bought Remodelista and Gardenista from SAY Media for an undisclosed amount.
Also in 2015, Amazon announced their Expert Articles as part of an expanded content platform with Remodelista as one of the early industry experts announced.

In 2016, Remodelista and Gardenista was acquired by Realtor.com, operated by the News Corporation subsidiary Move, Inc. At the time of sale, the two sites reportedly received 1.5 million readers per month.

In November 2017, Remodelista launched a second companion site, The Organized Home, in conjunction with the publication of the book Remodelista: The Organized Home.

In June 2019, Remodelista announced that it's once again independently owned along with sister sites Gardenista and Organized Home after three years as part of News Corporation subsidiary Realtor.com. According to the announcement, the transition was due to a strategy restructure following Realtor.com's $210 million acquisition of real-estate leads generation platform OpCity. Few details surrounding the deal were released but they reported that the combined readership of the sites reached 1.7 million users per month.

Site features 
Remodelista is a sourcebook for the considered home, guiding readers through the remodeling and design process. In addition, the blog publishes lifestyle content, including pieces about travel. The travel section covers noteworthy design shops and hotels, restaurants and other design-oriented sights in the US and abroad. Often these pieces will have an "Expert Advice" angle, with a design professional providing advice  about shops, hotels, and restaurants.

In 2010, the website launched an invitation-only directory of architects and designers. Editor at Large named it one of the top four online designer directories in 2014.

In 2013, the website first launched its "Considered Design Awards," a series of awards for reader-submitted photos of their interior spaces.

Events 
Between 2010 and 2016, Remodelista hosted 18 Remodelista Markets in Marin County, San Francisco, Los Angeles, Boston, Portland, Seattle, NYC, and London. Remodelista Markets offered goods from artisanal makers and designers, which included handmade ceramics, clothing, jewelry, organic botanicals, and artisanal foods.

Related websites 
Remodelista's sister site Gardenista, which focuses on outdoor spaces, was launched in 2011 initially as a section of Remodelista. It became a separate website in 2012.

In November 2017, Remodelista launched a second companion site, The Organized Home, in conjunction with the publication of the book Remodelista: The Organized Home.

Books 
In October 2013, Remodelista: A Manual For The Considered Home, written by Julie Carlson with photography by Matthew Williams, was published by Artisan. The book includes tours of homes and advice on how to recreate one's own space in a similar style. Academy Awards winner Julianne Moore wrote the foreword to the book.

In November 2017, Artisan published Remodelista: The Organized Home, written by Julie Carlson and Margot Guralnick with photography by Matthew Williams.

External links 
 Remodelista
 Gardenista
 The Organized Home

References 

Lifestyle websites
Internet properties established in 2007
Companies based in Manhattan
Mass media companies based in New York City